In 1833–56 James King established and ran a pottery at Irrawang in the lower Hunter Region in New South Wales (the site is now known as the Grahamstown Dam).

The site of the Irrawang Pottery was excavated from August 1967 by students and volunteers under the umbrella of the Archaeology Society of the University of Sydney, directed by Judy Birmingham. The work continued for over a decade and is still poorly published. Although originally conceived as a training exercise for archaeologists prior to their undertaking fieldwork in the Middle East the momentum generated by the project led to the establishment of the Australian Society for Historical Archaeology in 1970 and the introduction of a historical archaeology course at the University of Sydney in 1974.

References

 Bickford, Anne 1971 'James King of Irrawang: a colonial entrepreneur', Journal of the Royal Australian Historical Society, 56: Pt 1
 Birmingham, J. M., R. Ian Jack, and D. Jeans. 1983. Industrial Archaeology in Australia: rural industry. Richmond: Heinemann Educational Books.
 Jack, R.I. and Carol A Liston, 1982  'A Scottish immigrant in NSW – James King of Irrawang', Journal of the Royal Australian Historical Society, 68: Pt 2

Archaeology of Australia
Port Stephens Council
Australian pottery